Jesse Walker (September 10, 1904 – January 26, 1984), nicknamed "Hoss", was an American Negro league shortstop and manager from the 1920s into the 1950s.

A native of Austin, Texas, Walker made his Negro leagues debut in 1929 with the Bacharach Giants. He went on to enjoy a 20-year playing career, and was a successful manager for many years. He was selected to manage the East team at the East–West All-Star Game in 1949 and 1950. Walker died in San Antonio, Texas in 1984 at age 79.

References

External links
 and Seamheads

1904 births
1984 deaths
Bacharach Giants players
Baltimore Elite Giants players
Birmingham Black Barons players
Cleveland Cubs players
Columbus Elite Giants players
Homestead Grays players
Indianapolis Clowns players
Memphis Red Sox players
Negro league baseball managers
New York Black Yankees players
Washington Elite Giants players
Baseball shortstops
Baseball players from Austin, Texas
20th-century African-American sportspeople